Kasenga Airport  is an airport serving the town of Kasenga in Democratic Republic of the Congo.

See also

 List of airports in the Democratic Republic of the Congo

References

 OurAirports - Kasenga
 Kasenga
 Great Circle Mapper - Kasenga

External links
 HERE Maps - Kasenga

Airports in Haut-Katanga Province